Costanzo Angelini (Santa Giusta, Rieti, 1760 - Naples, 1853) was an Italian painter, engraver, and restorer of the Neoclassical style.

Biography
While in Rome, he became of follower or Giovanni Volpato and Raffaello Morghen, and when he moved to Naples in 1790, he became popular for his Neoclassic paintings. He is known for having engraved the Greek Vases of the Hamilton collection (1795). He was patronized as a portrait painter by the aristocracy and court. He became superintendent and restorer for the  Museo Borbonico (1813). He became a professor of design with the Neapolitan Real Accademia delle Belle Arti; in 1841, he was secretary to the Academy. Filippo Balbi and Michele de Napoli were among his pupils. His son, Tito Angelini, became a sculptor, who followed the Neoclassic-Romantic style of Canova. His daughter Teresa Angelini (born 1803) was also a painter. Among his pupils was Giuseppe Marsigli.

Sources
 Italian Treccani Encyclopedia entry.
Vasi dipinti del museo Vivenzio disegnati da Costanzo Angelini nel 1798

1760 births
1853 deaths
People from Rieti
18th-century Italian painters
Italian male painters
19th-century Italian painters
Italian neoclassical painters
Painters from Naples
Academic staff of the Accademia di Belle Arti di Napoli
19th-century Italian male artists
18th-century Italian male artists